Aishath Maain Rasheed (2 November 1992) is a Maldivian singer.

Early life
At the age of seven, Maain's interest in music grew as she observes her father, Ibrahim Rasheed, working as a mentor to the students of MES Malé English School, participating in Television Maldives Interschool Singing Competition. In 2000, she presented her first stage performance while studying in Jamaluddin school where she was ranked third in her age category. The following year, she received the first place from her age category and second place in Junior Age Group. Ever since, till 2008, she was placed in the top five of the competition.

In 2008, during her last year of secondary education, Maain participated in the National Centre for the Arts Interschool Singing Competition and won several awards including, best performer in her age category, best performer in senior age group and best performer of the competition. She then auditioned for the Maldivian edition of Voice of India, in which she was selected to perform alongside Abbas, an Indian singer. However, citing the tragic death of Voice of India title holder, Ishmeet Singh, she lost her chance at international exposure.

Career
In 2009, Maain was offered to feature in the singing show Ehandhaanugai Duet alongside Hussain Shiham, where they performed the a recreated version of the retro song "Kuri Khiyaal Hithuge Noora". Their performance and the song was positively received by the audience where it was placed in the top ten performances of the show. She then auditioned for a local television singing show, Maldivian Icon where she got selected as the runner-up from the competition, which resulted in her receiving several offers from music directors and producers. The same year, she made her career debut with the romantic song "Loabin Thi Hiyy Hiba Kohfinama" from the film Udhabaani which fetched her a nomination as the Best Female Playback Singer at 1st Maldives Film Awards ceremony. She next contributed to the soundtrack album of the films Jinni (2010), Fanaa (2010) and Niuma (2010), where her soft rendition of the song "Hiyy Dhevijje Kalaayah Huvaa" from the latter fetched her first nomination as the Best Female Playback Singer at the 6th Gaumee Film Awards ceremony. The success was continued with her second nomination as the Best Female Singer at the 7th Gaumee Film Awards ceremony, for the title song of Hiyy Yaara Dheefa (2011).

Maain is mainly known for her slow paced romantic songs and the classical influence in her rendition with her higher octave vocals. However, in her career she has tried other genres of songs including hip-hop with the song "Bunelaa Loabivey", while experimenting with her lower vocal ranges in songs like "Ishqun Masthey Vanee". On 4 April 2015, Maain married a local musician, Ibrahim Shifaz. In the media she is lauded for her courage to pursue a professional career in music despite her medical limitations as a thalassemia patient.

Discography

Feature film

Non-Film songs

Accolades

References 

Living people
People from Malé
1992 births
Maldivian playback singers